Baby Consuelo (born Bernadete Dinorah de Carvalho Cidade July 18, 1952), known professionally as Baby do Brasil, is a Brazilian performer, singer and composer.

Although she is known for her energetic performances and compositions in pop, Baby has also composed for the samba and MPB scene. Early in her career she was a member of Novos Baianos, and was at once married to Brazilian guitarist and bandmate Pepeu Gomes. Her 1985 album, "Sem Pecado e Sem Juízo" sold more than 1 million copies.

From her marriage to Pepeu Gomes, she has three daughters (who also made up the Brazilian pop group, SNZ) and three sons, Pedro Baby, Krishna and Kriptus.

Discography

with Novos Baianos
É Ferro na Boneca (1970)
Acabou Chorare (1972)
Novos Baianos F.C. (1973)
Novos Baianos (1974)
Vamos Pro Mundo (1974)
Caia na Estrada e Perigas Ver (1976)
Praga de Baiano (1977)
Farol da Barra (1978)
Infinito Circular (1997, ao vivo)

Solo
O Que Vier Eu Traço (1978)
Pra Enlouquecer (1979)
Ao Vivo Em Montreux (1980)
Canceriana Telúrica (1981)
Cósmica (1982)
Kryshna Baby (1984)
Sem Pecado E Sem Juízo (1985)
Ora Pro Nobis (1991)
Um (1997)
Acústico Baby do Brasil (1998)
Exclusivo Para Deus (2000)
A Menina Ainda Dança – Baby Sucessos (2015)

References

External links

 Discography
 Two Parties and Baby do Brasil to Celebrate Brazil Day in Los Angeles – Brazzil Mag
 [ Baby do Brasil at Allmusic]

1952 births
Living people
Brazilian composers
20th-century Brazilian women singers
20th-century Brazilian singers
Brazilian pop singers
Música Popular Brasileira singers
Samba musicians
Performers of contemporary Christian music
Brazilian gospel singers
Converts to evangelical Christianity
Brazilian evangelicals
People from Niterói